In the Arms of God is the seventh studio album by American heavy metal band Corrosion of Conformity, released on April 5, 2005. To date, it is the only album of the band to not feature drummer Reed Mullin and the last to feature Pepper Keenan on vocals and guitar until 2018's No Cross No Crown; although he rejoined the band in 2014. Stanton Moore of the band Galactic played drums on this album.

Critical reception

In 2005, In the Arms of God was ranked number 330 in Rock Hard magazine's book of The 500 Greatest Rock & Metal Albums of All Time.

Track listing
All lyrics written by Pepper Keenan except "Infinite War", co-written with Mike Dean. All music written by Dean, Keenan, and Woody Weatherman unless noted.

Personnel

Corrosion of Conformity
Pepper Keenan – lead vocals, rhythm guitar
Woody Weatherman – lead guitar, vocals
Mike Dean – bass guitar, vocals, engineer

Additional personnel
 Stanton Moore – drums
 John Custer – producer

Chart positions
Album

References

Corrosion of Conformity albums
2005 albums
Sanctuary Records albums